Westminster Bridge is a road-and-foot-traffic bridge over the River Thames in London, linking Westminster on the west side and Lambeth on the east side.

The bridge is painted predominantly green, the same colour as the leather seats in the House of Commons which is on the side of the Palace of Westminster nearest to the bridge, but a natural shade similar to verdigris. This is in contrast to Lambeth Bridge, which is red, the same colour as the seats in the House of Lords and is on the opposite side of the Houses of Parliament.

In 2005–2007, it underwent a complete refurbishment, including replacing the iron fascias and repainting the whole bridge.
It links the Palace of Westminster on the west side of the river with County Hall and the London Eye on the east and was the finishing point during the early years of the London Marathon.

The next bridge downstream is the Hungerford Bridge & Golden Jubilee Bridges and upstream is Lambeth Bridge. Westminster Bridge was designated a Grade II* listed structure in 1981.

History
For over 600 years (at least 1129–1729), the nearest Thames bridge to London Bridge was at Kingston. From late Tudor times congestion in trading hours at London Bridge (for road goods and carriages from Kent, Essex, much of Surrey, Middlesex and beyond) often amounted to more than an hour. A bridge at Westminster was proposed in 1664, but opposed by the Corporation of London and the watermen. Further opposition held sway in 1722. However an intervening bridge (albeit in timber) was built at Putney in 1729 and the scheme received parliamentary approval in 1736. Financed by private capital, lotteries and grants, Westminster Bridge was built between 1739–1750, under the supervision of the Swiss engineer Charles Labelye. The bridge opened on 18 November 1750.

The City of London responded to Westminster Bridge and the population growth by removing the buildings on London Bridge and widening it in 1760–63. With Putney Bridge, the bridge paved the way for four others within three decades: Blackfriars Bridge (1769, built by the City), Kew Bridge (1759), Battersea Bridge (1773), and Richmond Bridge (1777) by which date roads and vehicles were improved and fewer regular goods transported by water.

The bridge assisted the expanding West End to the developing South London as well as goods and carriages from the more estuarine counties and the East Sussex and Kentish ports. Without the bridge, traffic to and from the greater West End would have to negotiate streets often as congested as London Bridge, principally the Strand/Fleet Street and New Oxford Street/Holborn. Roads on both sides of the river were also built and improved, including Charing Cross Road and around the Elephant & Castle in Southwark.

By the mid-19th century the bridge was subsiding badly and expensive to maintain. The current bridge was designed by Thomas Page and opened on 24 May 1862. The bridge carried a tram line for much of the first half of the twentieth century, from 1906 until 1952. On 5 July that year the last tram made a ceremonial journey across the bridge. Since the removal of Rennie's New London Bridge in 1967 it is the oldest road structure which crosses the Thames in central London.

On 22 March 2017, a terrorist attack started on the bridge and continued into Bridge Street and Old Palace Yard. Five people – three pedestrians, one police officer, and the attacker – died as a result of the incident. A colleague of the officer (who was stationed nearby) was armed and shot the attacker. More than 50 people were injured. An investigation into the attack was conducted by the Metropolitan Police.

Image gallery

In popular culture

In the 1964 Doctor Who serial The Dalek Invasion of Earth, the Daleks are seen moving across it in the 22nd Century.
In 1807 the famous poem "Upon westminster bridge" by William wordsmith written while standing on the westminster bridge was published in the 'collection of poems' in two volumes.
In the 2002 British horror film 28 Days Later, the protagonist awakes from a coma to find London deserted and walks over an eerily empty Westminster Bridge whilst looking for signs of life.
Westminster Bridge is the start and finish point for the Bridges Handicap Race, a traditional London running race.
William Wordsworth wrote the sonnet Composed upon Westminster Bridge, September 3, 1802.
The bridge was the site of a Pit Stop during the fourth season of the Israeli version of The Amazing Race.
In the finale of the 24th James Bond film Spectre, Blofeld's helicopter crashes into Westminster Bridge.

See also
 List of crossings of the River Thames
 List of bridges in London

References

External links

 
 
 Interactive Panorama: Westminster Bridge

Transport in the City of Westminster
Transport in the London Borough of Lambeth
Buildings and structures in the City of Westminster
Buildings and structures in the London Borough of Lambeth
Bridges completed in 1750
Rebuilt buildings and structures in the United Kingdom
Bridges completed in 1862
Bridges across the River Thames
Road bridges in England
History of the London Borough of Lambeth
Grade II* listed buildings in the City of Westminster
Grade II* listed bridges in London
Arch bridges in the United Kingdom
1750 establishments in England
Bridges in London
Bridge light displays